The Young Kashgar Party was a Turkic nationalist Uighur political party which existed from 1933 to 1934. It helped found the First East Turkestan Republic, a separatist entity of the Republic of China. It was anti-Han and anti-Hui. The Uighur military leader Timur Beg and the Khotan Emirs Muhammad Amin Bughra, Abdullah Bughra and Nur Ahmad Jan Bughra formed an alliance with the Young Kashgar Party. It convened a parliament of 40 members and sent two delegates to Khoja Niyaz.

See also 
 First East Turkestan Republic
 Second East Turkestan Republic
 Timur Beg
 Young Bukharians
 Young Turks

References 

Pan-Turkist organizations
Defunct political parties in China
Political parties established in 1933
Political parties in the Republic of China
Anti-communist parties
Islamist groups
Islamic political parties
Nationalist movements in Asia
Xinjiang Wars
East Turkestan independence movement
Political parties of minorities
Indigenist political parties